Emily Wheaton is a British-Australian actress who played Sharon "Shazza" Cox in the Australian soap opera Neighbours in 2005. She appeared in the children's TV Show Noah and Saskia, and twice in the hit TV show Blue Heelers as Shayleen Burke. Wheaton played Brigitta in the Melbourne 2000 season of the Sound of Music with Lisa McCune and John Waters.

Emily has also appeared on Rush (channel 10 network) and appeared on the ABC series The Slap based on the novel by Christos Tsiolkas.

External links

Australian film actresses
Australian television actresses
British film actresses
British television actresses
Living people
1989 births
21st-century Australian actresses
21st-century British actresses